Scan Group is a shipping and logistics  company based in Copenhagen, Denmark.

History
The company was founded as Scan-Shipping by Arne Simonsen on 1 April 1969. Scan-Shipping Airfreight was established in 1978. The first office outside Denmark opened 1973 in New York (since 1988 Shipco Transport Inc.). The name was changed to Scan Group in 2010.

References

External links
 Official Scan Group website

Shipping companies of Denmark
Shipping companies based in Copenhagen
Transport companies established in 1969
Danish companies established in 1969
Companies based in Copenhagen Municipality